Maquoketa Valley Community School District is a rural public school district headquartered in Delhi, Iowa.  The district is completely within Delaware County, and serves Delhi, Delaware, Earlville, Hopkinton, and the surrounding rural areas.
The school mascot is the Wildcats, and their colors are black and gold.

The district hired Dave Hoeger as superintendent in April 2020, replacing the retiring Doug Tuetken.  He will also replace Tuetken as the shared superintendent with North Linn.

Schools
The district operates five schools:
 Delhi Elementary School, Delhi
 Earlville Elementary School, Earlville
 Johnston Elementary School, Hopkinton
 Maquoketa Valley Middle School, Delhi
 Maquoketa Valley High School, Delhi

Maquoketa Valley High School

Athletics
The Wildcats participate in the Tri-Rivers Conference in the following sports:
Football
Cross Country
 Girls' 1988 Class 1A State Champions
Volleyball
Basketball
Wrestling
Golf
Track and Field
Soccer
Baseball
Softball

See also
List of school districts in Iowa
List of high schools in Iowa

References

External links
 Maquoketa Valley Community School District

School districts in Iowa
Education in Delaware County, Iowa